"Jet Boy, Jet Girl" is a song by Elton Motello about a 15-year-old boy's sexual relationship with an older man, who then rejects him for a girl.

Background
 but the truth is that the two songs were simultaneous adaptations of the same backing track.

While Bertrand's single was an international hit, Motello's single in English made little impact, except in Australia, where it was released on the RCA label and hit #33 on the National Top Forty (and regionally in Melbourne at #11 and in Sydney, at #10). Also in Australia, "Jet Boy, Jet Girl" has appeared in a television commercial featuring the chorus and not the sexual lyrics.

Composition
"Jet Boy, Jet Girl" has the same backing track as Plastic Bertrand/Lou Deprijck's "Ça plane pour moi". A few months before the vocals for "Ça plane pour moi" were recorded, the record firm used the same backing track with the same musicians to release "Jet Boy, Jet Girl". Alan Ward recorded his song in English.

United States censorship
In 1989, the American Federal Communications Commission (FCC), acting on a complaint from activist Jack Thompson fined radio station WIOD $10,000 for allowing talk host Neil Rogers to play the song. Thompson considered the song obscene, and the FCC agreed with him.

Charts

Personnel
Elton Motello
 Alan Ward/Alan Timms – vocals
 Jet Staxx/Mike Butcher – guitar
 John Valke – bass
 Bob Dartch – drums

Cover versions
The song has been covered by numerous bands, including The Damned, FIDLAR, 
Captain Sensible & the Softies, Chron Gen, the Bamboo Kids, the pUKEs, Manic Hispanic, and Crocodiles. The New York City female punk rock band The Breaking Sounds covers the song as well the lyrics being sung in both Finnish and English. The original version received renewed attention when it was included on John Waters' 2007 compilation CD A Date with John Waters. Canadian recording artist and drag queen Mina Mercury also recorded the song in 2019.

References

1977 debut singles
LGBT-related songs
1977 songs
EMI Records singles
Captain Sensible songs